Joseph S. Camp Jr. (born April 20, 1939) is a motion picture director and writer who is best known as the creator and director of the Benji films, as well as Hawmps! and The Double McGuffin.

Camp resides in Bell Buckle, Tennessee with his wife Kathleen. They previously owned property in Valley Center, California.

Camp is also known for his work with horses. He owns, and has trained, five horses who lived with him at his Valley Center Ranch. He has written a book about his experiences with horses, The Soul of a Horse.

His autobiography, Underdog: How One Man Turned Hollywood Rejection into the Worldwide Phenomenon of Benji (published 1993) —republished as Benji and Me  in 2000—covers more than just his experience making "Dog" movies.

Joe Camp is also the author of The Soul of a Horse: Life Lessons from the Herd, a 2008 book that tells his story of discovery after he and his wife bought their first horses.  

He owns a production company, Mulberry Square Productions, and had a minority interest in the film studio, Filmdallas Pictures.

Filmography
Benji (1974)
Hawmps! (1976)
For the Love of Benji (1977)
Benji's Very Own Christmas Story (TV short 1978)
The Double McGuffin (1979)
Oh! Heavenly Dog (1980)
Benji, Zax & the Alien Prince (TV series 1983)
Benji the Hunted (1987)
Benji: Off the Leash! (2004)

References

External links
 
 About Joe and Kathleen Camp

1939 births
Living people
American male screenwriters
Writers from St. Louis
People from Bell Buckle, Tennessee
Film directors from Tennessee
Screenwriters from Missouri
Screenwriters from Tennessee